Season six of Mira quién baila premiered on Univision and Las Estrellas on July 29, 2018 and concluded on September 16, 2018. It is the first season to air in Mexico. The TV series is the Spanish version of British version Strictly Come Dancing and American version Dancing with the Stars. Ten celebrities are paired with ten professional ballroom dancers. Javier Poza and Chiquinquirá Delgado return as the show's hosts, while Joaquín Cortés, Lola Cortés, and season 5 winner Dayanara Torres joined as judges. The winner, Greeicy Rendón, received $25,000 for her charity and sponsored 9 houses, intended for families affected by the 2017 Central Mexico earthquake.

Celebrities

Ratings

References

2018 American television seasons